Nazrul Islam Babu (17 July 1949 – 14 September 1990) was a Bangladeshi lyricist. His notable songs include "Sob Kota Janala Khule Dao Na", "O Amar Aat Koti Phul" and "Ekti Bangladesh Tumi Jagroto Janotar". He won Bangladesh National Film Award for Best Lyrics for the film Padma Meghna Jamuna (1991).

Biography
Babu was born to Bazlul Kader and Rezia Begum. He was the eldest among four brothers and five sisters. Babu studied in Brojomohun College and Ashek Mahmud College in Jamalpur.

On 22 January 2022, Babu was awarded the Ekushey Padak, the second most important award for civilians in Bangladesh.

Babu married Shahin Akhter on 23 November 1984. They had two daughters, Nazia and Nafia.

Works
 Padma Meghna Jamuna (1991)
 Shuvoda (1986)
 Mohanayok (1985)
 Dui Poisar Alta (1982)

References

External links

1949 births
1990 deaths
People from Jamalpur District
Bangladeshi lyricists
Best Lyricist National Film Award (Bangladesh) winners
Place of death missing
Recipients of the Ekushey Padak